The canton of Créances is an administrative division of the Manche department, northwestern France. It was created at the French canton reorganisation which came into effect in March 2015. Its seat is in Créances.

It consists of the following communes:

Bretteville-sur-Ay
Canville-la-Rocque
Créances
Doville
La Feuillie
La Haye
Laulne
Lessay
Millières
Montsenelle
Neufmesnil
Pirou
Le Plessis-Lastelle
Saint-Germain-sur-Ay
Saint-Nicolas-de-Pierrepont
Saint-Patrice-de-Claids
Saint-Sauveur-de-Pierrepont
Varenguebec
Vesly

References

Cantons of Manche